This is a list of electoral results for the Electoral district of Mundaring in Western Australian state elections.

Members for Mundaring

Election results

Elections in the 1980s

 Preferences were not distributed.

Elections in the 1970s

References

Western Australian state electoral results by district